The neonatal heel prick is a blood collection procedure done on newborns. It consists of making a pinprick puncture in one heel of the newborn to collect their blood.  This technique is used frequently as the main way to collect blood from neonates.  Other techniques include venous or arterial needle sticks, cord blood sampling, or umbilical line collection.  This technique is often utilized for the Guthrie test, where it is used to soak the blood into pre-printed collection cards known as Guthrie cards.

The classical Guthrie test is named after Robert Guthrie, an American bacteriologist and physician who devised it in 1962. The test has been widely used throughout North America and Europe as one of the core newborn screening tests since the late 1960s. The test was initially a bacterial inhibition assay, but is gradually being replaced in many areas by newer techniques such as tandem mass spectrometry that can detect a wider variety of congenital diseases.

Detected diseases
The blood samples can be used for a variety of metabolic tests to detect genetic conditions, including:

 Immunoreactive trypsinogen to detect cystic fibrosis.
 Maple syrup urine disease (MSUD or Branched Chain Ketonuria) a rare disorder where an error in metabolism inhibits the breakdown of amino acid leucine, isoleucine and valine.  It can impair brain development.
 Medium-chain acyl-coenzyme A dehydrogenase deficiency (MCADD)
 Phenylketonuria, a disorder where an error in amino acid metabolism can impair brain development (PKU)
 Sickle-cell disease
 Thyroid stimulating hormone (TSH) or Thyroxin (T4) to detect congenital hypothyroidism and hence prevent cretinism.
 Isovaleric acidemia (IVA)
 Homocystinuria (pyridoxine unresponsive) (HCU)
 17-hydroxy-progesterone (17-OHP) to detect adrenogenital syndrome, also known as congenital adrenal hyperplasia
 Galactosemia

Mechanism
The test uses the growth of a strain of bacteria on a specially-prepared agar plate as a sign for the presence of high levels of phenylalanine, phenylpyruvate, and/or phenyllactate.  The compound B-2-thienylalanine will inhibit the growth of the bacterium Bacillus subtilis (ATCC 6051) on minimal culture media.  If phenylalanine, phenylpyruvate, and/or phenyllactate is added to the medium, then growth is restored.  Such compounds will be present in excess in the blood or urine of patients with PKU.  If a suitably-prepared sample of blood or urine is applied to the seeded agar plate, the growth of the bacteria in the test will be a positive indicator for PKU in the patient.

To prepare the sample for application, a small amount of blood (from a heel puncture, for example) or urine (from a diaper, for example) is applied to a piece of filter paper.  Then a small disc is punched from the center of the spot of blood or urine, and the disc applied to the surface of a seeded, minimal-medium agar plate that contains added beta-2-thienylalanine.  If the sample contains phenylalanine, phenylpyruvate, and/or phenyllactate then these compounds will diffuse into the agar medium.  If their concentrations are high enough (as with the excess levels seen with PKU), bacteria will grow under the disc, but not elsewhere.  Generally an overnight incubation is enough to determine whether phenylalanine, phenylpyruvate, and/or phenyllactate are present in unusual concentrations in blood or urine.

Timing
The blood spot sample should be taken between 48 and 72 hours of age for
all babies regardless of medical condition, milk feeding
and prematurity.  For the purpose of screening, date
of birth is day 0 (some IT systems record date of birth
as day 1). False positives and false negatives can sometimes occur when the screening tests are performed before 48 hours.

With genetic tests becoming more common, a wide variety of tests may use the blood drawn by this method. Many neonatal units (SCBUs) now use this method to carry out the daily blood tests (blood count, electrolytes) required to check the progress of ill neonates.

Data retention controversy
In Ireland, a controversy emerged in 2012 whereby a number of hospitals retained heel prick test cards and thereby a DNA database with over a million samples from 1984, without consent or notification of parents. This resulted in a ten-year rolling destruction cycle being introduced. Similar practices exist in the United Kingdom, New Zealand, and several states of the United States.

See also 
 Dried blood spot testing
 Galactosemia
 Heel stick wound
 Hyperphenylalaninemia
 Newborn screening

References

External links
 Heel prick test at the General Practice Notebook

Midwifery
Neonatology